Move to Move is the debut album by Kon Kan, released in 1989 on Atlantic Records. It spawned the singles "Harry Houdini", "I Beg Your Pardon", "Puss N' Boots" and "Move to Move". The album reached number 69 in Canada.

The album is mostly group member Barry Harris' creation. He produced the set, and wrote or co-wrote all but one cut. Kevin Wynne is lead vocalist on most songs, although Harris steps in for the title track, and the ballad, "Am I In Love." Jon Lind, who co-penned the Madonna song "Crazy for You", and Bob Mitchell ("The Flame" (Cheap Trick song)), co-wrote material with Harris for the project.

Track listing
 "Arts in 'D' Minor/Harry Houdini" (Barry Harris) - 6:42
 "Bite the Bullet" (Joe Neves Silva, Roman Panchyshyn) - 4:27
 "Move to Move" (Barry Harris, Bob Mitchell) - 4:39
 "I Can't Answer That" (Barry Harris, Bob Mitchell) - 3:48
 "I Beg Your Pardon (I Never Promised You a Rose Garden)" (Barry Harris) - 4:00
 "Am I in Love?" (Jon Lind, Barry Harris, Alan Coelho) - 5:06
 "Glue and Fire" (Barry Harris, Kevin Wynne) - 4:08
 "It Doesn't Matter" (Barry Harris, Dennis Matkosky) - 3:51
 "Puss n' Boots/These Boots (Are Made for Walking)" (Barry Harris, Kevin Wynne) - 3:46
 "Arts in 'D' Minor/Harry Houdini" (Justin Strauss 12" Remix) - 6:51
 "I Beg Your Pardon (I Never Promised You a Rose Garden)" (12" Remix) - 6:40

"Puss N' Boots/These Boots Are Made for Walkin'" contains a sample of Led Zeppelin's "Immigrant Song" (Jimmy Page, Robert Plant)

Personnel 
 Kevin Wynne - vocals
 Zulu Nation - rap vocals
 BX Style Bob - rap vocals
 Mark Goldenberg - acoustic guitar, programming
 Danny Pel - saxophone
 Danny Pelfrey - saxophone
 Luc Zoccolillo - piano
 Russell Ferrante - piano
 Simeon Pillich - bass
 Afrika Islam - scratches

Programming
 Dennis Matkosky
 Tom Gerencser
 Jim Lang

Background vocals
 Julia Tillman Waters
 Leslie Hall
 Jon Lind
 Julia Waters
 Maxine Willard Waters
 Debra Dobkin

References

1989 debut albums
Kon Kan albums
Atlantic Records albums